Staffhurst Wood is a  biological Site of Special Scientific Interest south of Oxted in Surrey. It is a Nature Conservation Review site, Grade 2.

This common on Weald Clay has been wooded since the Anglo-Saxon period and past management has left many ancient trees. The canopy is mainly pedunculate oak and the older trees support a rich  lichen flora. The moth fauna is outstanding, with six uncommon species.

There is access from Staffhurst Wood Road.

References

Local Nature Reserves in Surrey
Sites of Special Scientific Interest in Surrey
Nature Conservation Review sites